Indian Creek Township is the name of three townships in the U.S. state of Indiana:

 Indian Creek Township, Lawrence County, Indiana
 Indian Creek Township, Monroe County, Indiana
 Indian Creek Township, Pulaski County, Indiana

Indiana township disambiguation pages